Ceriagrion georgifreyi is a species of damselfly in the family Coenagrionidae. It is found in Greece, Syria, Turkey, and possibly Lebanon. Its natural habitats are rivers and freshwater springs. It is threatened by habitat loss.

References

Coenagrionidae
Insects described in 1953
Taxonomy articles created by Polbot